Hrethel is a king of the Geats.

 Name 

The name also appears as a genitive weak noun, in the half-line "þæt is Hrǣdlan lāf" ('that is Hrǣdla's bequest'). Rendered in ordinary Late West Saxon spelling and in nominative form, this form of the name would presumably have been *Hrēðla''.

Role in Beowulf 
Hrethel is married to a sister or daughter of Swerting (Hygelac is the nefa of Swerting) and he has three sons: Hæþcyn, Herebeald and Hygelac. He also has a daughter who marries Ecgþeow and has the son Beowulf.

Hrethel fosters Beowulf (his grandson) by taking him into his royal household aged seven. Fostering was a common Germanic practice and does not indicate Beowulf's father, Ecgþeow did not want to raise him; indeed, the practice was intended to further improve relations between families and family members, and create close ties of obligation, affection and shared responsibility. As an adult, Beowulf expresses his gratitude to his foster-father explicitly:

Hreðel dies of grief when his oldest son Herebeald is killed by his own brother Hæþcyn in a hunting accident, a death that could not be avenged. He is succeeded by Hæþcyn.

References

Characters in Beowulf
English heroic legends
Kings of the Geats